Robert Wilson House is a historic home located in East Fallowfield Township, Chester County, Pennsylvania. It was built in 1823, and is a two-story, five bay, stuccoed stone dwelling with a gable roof. The house has small wings on both sides. It features a formal entryway with pilasters and an elliptical fanlight.  It is representative of a Federal style farmhouse.

It was added to the National Register of Historic Places in 1985.

References

Houses on the National Register of Historic Places in Pennsylvania
Federal architecture in Pennsylvania
Houses completed in 1823
Houses in Chester County, Pennsylvania
National Register of Historic Places in Chester County, Pennsylvania